Stein Erik Lauvås (born 3 May 1965) is a Norwegian politician for the Labour Party.

He served as a deputy representative to the Norwegian Parliament from Østfold during the terms 2001–2005 and 2005–2009.

On the local level Lauvås is the mayor of Marker municipality since 2003.

References

1965 births
Living people
Deputy members of the Storting
Labour Party (Norway) politicians
Mayors of places in Østfold
21st-century Norwegian politicians